Okechukwu Ukeje, known as OC Ukeje is Nigerian actor,model and musician. He came into prominence after winning the Amstel Malta Box Office (AMBO) reality show. He has received several awards including Africa Movie Academy Awards, Africa Magic Viewers Choice Awards, Nollywood Movies Awards, Best of Nollywood Awards, Nigeria Entertainment Awards and Golden Icons Academy Movie Awards. He has featured in several award-winning films including Two Brides and a Baby, Hoodrush, Alan Poza, Confusion Na Wa and Half of a Yellow Sun.

Early life 
Okechukwu Ukeje, a native of Umuahia Abia State, was born and raised in Lagos State, Nigeria. He is the second child of a family of three.

Career 
He attended Federal Government College Ijanikin, Ojo, Lagos. He began his career in acting from his first year at the University of Lagos, Yaba, with a lead role in a stage play. He went on to pursue both music and acting, focusing mainly on acting in stage plays for the first four years of his career before attempting and winning a reality TV show, Amstel Malta Box Office (AMBO). His first screen appearance was in White Waters (2007) with Joke Silva and Rita Dominic. The film was directed by Izu Ojukwu. He won the African Movie Academy Awards (AMAA) for the Most Promising Actor (2008) and the City People's Award for Best New Act (2010).

He continued to write music, collaborating with a few Nigerian musical artists and producers and working on radio jingles for corporate organizations. He has worked in movies and television between 2008 and 2012.

He was a member of the cast of the TV series that was presented at the International Emmy World Television Festival, Wetin Dey (2007) produced by the BBC World Service Trust and played lead and supporting lead roles in films like Comrade, Confusion Na Wa and Awakening. He was also featured in Black November (2012) by Jeta Amata with cast members including Mickey Rourke, Kim Basinger, Sarah Wayne-Callies, Hakeem Kae-Kazim, Vivica Fox and a host of others. He was also in the film adaptation of Chimamanda Ngozi Adichie's Half of a Yellow Sun (2013) with Chiwetel Ejiofor and Thandiwe Newton as the lead cast, directed by Biyi Bandele. He was on the repertory team that showcased 3 stage plays for the Nigeria House at the London Cultural Olympiad (2012). He also acted in the BFI sponsored film, Gone Too Far.  He was in NdaniTV's series Gidi Up with Titilope Sonuga, Deyemi Okanlawon, Somkele Iyamah and Ikechukwu Onunaku. In January 2015, he was listed by Nigerian Cinema Exhibition Coalition as one of the highest box office grosser of 2014.

In 2016, he was invited with Somkele Iyamah to attend the Toronto International Film Festival as "rising stars".

Personal life 
Ukeje lives in Lagos, Nigeria. He married Senami Ibukunoluwa Togonu-Bickersteth on 8 November 2014.

Filmography

Awards

References

External links 

Nigerian male musicians
Living people
1981 births
Male actors from Lagos
21st-century Nigerian male actors
University of Lagos alumni
Nigerian film actors
Nigerian male models
Nigerian musicians
Participants in Nigerian reality television series
People from Abia State